Affluenza: The All-Consuming Epidemic is a 2001 anti-consumerist book by John de Graaf, environmental scientist David Wann, and economist Thomas H. Naylor. Viewing consumerism (with its accompanying overwork and dissatisfaction) as a deliberately spread disease, the book consists of three parts—symptoms, origins, and treatment. Affluenza is described as "a painful, contagious, socially transmitted condition of overload, debt, anxiety, and waste resulting from the dogged pursuit of more".

The book was considered one of the eight best non-fiction books of the year by Detroit Free Press, and copies were given to every freshman by two universities. Amazon.com lists 38 books citing it. The book was highly recommended for academic and public libraries by M. Bay from Indiana University in Library Journal. The Idaho State University has focused its Book Reading Project 2007 on the book.

See also
 Affluenza
 Affluenza: When Too Much is Never Enough

Translations
 French – J'achète!: combattre l'épidémie de surconsommation [Saint-Laurent]: Fides, 2004
 German – Affluenza. Zeitkrankheit Konsum. Random House: Omnibus Kinder und Jugend TB, München, 2002
 Russian – Потреблятство. Болезнь, угрожающая миру — Екатеринбург, Ультра.Культура, 2005
 Traditional Chinese - 告別富裕流感-21世紀新財富觀. 陳晉茂,黃玉華,鄭文琦譯.台北縣新店市:立緒文化, 2009

References

External links
 Reviews at findarticles.com, simpleliving.net and buzzflash.com
 Affluenza at David Wann website

2001 non-fiction books
Anti-corporate activism
Non-fiction books about consumerism